The 2022 All-Ireland Senior Hurling Championship was the 135th staging of the All-Ireland Senior Hurling Championship, the Gaelic Athletic Association's premier inter-county hurling tournament, since its establishment in 1887. The provincial fixtures were released on 27 November 2021. The championship began on 16 April 2022 and ended on 17 July 2022.

Limerick entered the championship as defending champions having won the previous two championships.

Westmeath, having won the 2021 Joe McDonagh Cup, returned to the Leinster Championship for the first time since the 2017 competition.

The All-Ireland final was played on 17 July 2022 at Croke Park in Dublin, between Limerick and Kilkenny. Defending champions Limerick won the game by 1-31 to 2-26 to claim their fourth title in five years and their first ever three-in-a-row.

Limerick captain Declan Hannon became the first captain to lift the Liam MacCarthy Cup four times.

Teams

Personnel and general information

Summary

Championships

Munster Senior Hurling Championship

Leinster Senior Hurling Championship

Joe McDonagh Cup

Christy Ring Cup

Nicky Rackard Cup

Lory Meagher Cup

2022 County Ranking (Championship)

Leinster Senior Hurling Championship

Leinster table

Antrim beat Kerry in the 2022 Joe McDonagh Cup final and were promoted to the 2023 Leinster Senior Hurling Championship. Laois were relegated to the 2023 Joe McDonagh Cup as they finished last in the 2022 Leinster Senior Hurling Championship.

Leinster round 1

Leinster round 2

Leinster round 3

Leinster round 4

Leinster round 5

Leinster final

Munster Senior Hurling Championship

Munster table

Munster round 1

Munster round 2

Munster round 3

Munster round 4

Munster round 5

Munster final

Joe McDonagh Cup

All-Ireland Senior Hurling Championship

Bracket

Preliminary quarter-finals

Quarter-finals

Semi-finals

All-Ireland final

Championship statistics

Top scorers

Top scorer overall

In a single game

Miscellaneous

 Cork's Patrick Horgan surpassed Joe Canning to become the championship's all-time top scorer.
Cork's seventeenth year in a row without an All-Ireland senior title, their longest dry spell since the founding of the championship.
It was the first championship meeting between Cork and Antrim since 2010.
It was the first championship meeting between Wexford and Kerry since the 1891 All-Ireland Senior Hurling Championship Final.
This was Kilkenny's seventh season in a row without a title, their worst streak since 1984–1991 (which was eight years in a row). The last time Kilkenny lost three All Ireland finals per appearance was in 1940, 1945 and 1946 to Limerick, Tipperary and Cork respectively.
 Limerick join an elite group of hurling teams to have won 3 All Ireland's in a row. Kilkenny achieved this feat in 2008, previous to that Cork won it in 1978 and Tipperary last completed it in 1951.

Live televised games 
RTÉ, the national broadcaster in Ireland, provided the majority of the live television coverage of the hurling championship with 17 games shown.
Sky Sports also broadcast a number of matches and had exclusive rights to some games.

Awards
Sunday Game Team of the Year
The Sunday Game team of the year was picked 17 July on the night of the final.
The panel consisting of Jackie Tyrrell, Brendan Cummins, Donal Óg Cusack, Davy Fitzgerald, Shane Dowling, and Ursula Jacob chose Diarmaid Byrnes as the Sunday game player of the year from a list that also contained TJ Reid and Barry Nash.

1. Nickie Quaid (Limerick)
2. Sean Finn (Limerick)
3. Huw Lawlor (Kilkenny)
4. Barry Nash (Limerick)
5. Diarmuid Byrnes (Limerick)
6. Declan Hannon (Limerick)
7. Pádraic Mannion (Galway)
8. Adrian Mullen (Kilkenny)
9. David Fitzgerald (Clare)
10. Gearoid Hegarty (Limerick)
11. Kyle Hayes (Limerick)
12. Shane O'Donnell (Clare)
13. Aaron Gillane (Limerick)
14. TJ Reid (Kilkenny)
15. Tony Kelly (Clare)

All Star Team of the Year
On 28 October, the All-Star winners were presented at a black-tie ceremony at the Convention Centre in Dublin.
Diarmaid Byrnes was named as the All Stars Hurler of the Year with Mikey Butler named the All Stars Young Hurler of the Year.

References 

2022 in hurling